Ghost Beach may refer to:
Ghost Beach (Goosebumps), the 1994 22nd volume of the Goosebumps children's book series by R. L. Stine
Ghost Beach (band), American electronic music duo